Aleksandr Mikhalenko (born 12 December 2001) is a Belarusian professional footballer who plays for Energetik-BGU Minsk on loan from Dinamo Minsk.

References

External links 
 
 

2001 births
Living people
Belarusian footballers
Association football defenders
FC Dinamo Minsk players
FC Sputnik Rechitsa players
FC Dnepr Mogilev players
FC Isloch Minsk Raion players
FC Energetik-BGU Minsk players